Barry J. Zimmerman is an educational researcher at the City University of New York, where he holds the title Distinguished Professor of Educational Psychology. He has written scholarly publications on learning and motivation, many describing his research and theories on self-regulated learning. In 2011, Zimmerman was awarded the E.L. Thorndike Career Achievement award by the American Psychological Association's Division of Educational Psychology.

See also
Albert Bandura

References

Educational psychologists
Living people
Year of birth missing (living people)